Cosmos: Possible Worlds is a 2020 American science documentary television series that premiered on March 9, 2020, on National Geographic. The series is a follow-up to the 2014 television series Cosmos: A Spacetime Odyssey, which followed the original Cosmos: A Personal Voyage series presented by Carl Sagan on PBS in 1980. The series is presented by astrophysicist Neil deGrasse Tyson, written, directed, and executive-produced by Ann Druyan and Brannon Braga, with other executive producers being Seth MacFarlane and Jason Clark.

The series consists of 13 episodes that were broadcast over seven weeks. The series had its broadcast television premiere on Fox on September 22, 2020. Braga explains that "Possible Worlds refers to planets far, far away, but also ... the future as a possible world."

Development and production
On January 13, 2018, it was announced that another season titled Cosmos: Possible Worlds would debut in 2019 on Fox and National Geographic channels, to be hosted by Neil deGrasse Tyson and executive produced by Ann Druyan, Seth MacFarlane, Brannon Braga, and Jason Clark. The studio portions were filmed at Santa Fe Studios with plans for location shooting in the Pacific Northwest, Europe, and Asia.

This 13-episode sequel series was slated to premiere on March 3, 2019, on Fox, and the following day on National Geographic. However, from December 2018 through February 2019, Tyson became the subject of sexual harassment allegations. Both National Geographic and Fox stated they would investigate these allegations, and indefinitely postponed the premiere of Cosmos on February 15, 2019. National Geographic and Fox completed their investigation and cleared Tyson of the allegations by March 15, 2019, and affirmed that Cosmos would resume at some point.

The series premiered in early March 2020 in the United States on the National Geographic Channel and was scheduled to air on Fox afterwards, as well as in 172 other countries.

Druyan expects the series to be inspiring, with a strong emphasis on a hopeful future, and she hopes that the series will help correct antiscience rhetoric and policies. Druyan also stated that, due to current events, she was motivated "by a greater sense of urgency" when writing the new series as compared to the previous series. Regarding a line she wrote for episode 1: "Our ship of the imagination is propelled by twin engines of skepticism and wonder" Druyan said:

The tone of the series has been described as optimistic. Tyson said the series is "a very hopeful vision of what we can do if we're enlightened enough." Druyan has expressed the hope that "If we start listening to what the scientists are telling us, we can get out of this horrible mess that we've created for ourselves." Druyan was awarded the National Geographic Further Award by the 2020 Sun Valley Film Festival for her work on Cosmos.

Cast
Seth MacFarlane as United States President Harry S. Truman
Patrick Stewart as astronomer William Herschel
Viggo Mortensen as Soviet plant geneticist Nikolai Vavilov
Judd Hirsch as J. Robert Oppenheimer, the father of the atomic bomb
Sasha Sagan (daughter of Ann Druyan and Carl Sagan) as Rachel Gruber Sagan, Carl Sagan's mother

Episodes

Book
Druyan authored a companion book to the series released in February 2020.  As was the case with the original Cosmos book, it is divided into thirteen chapters, mostly titled after the episodes, with a  variant sequence.

Possible sequel
When asked if she was planning another season of Cosmos, Druyan said "Yes! I very much have season four in mind, and I know what it’s going to be. And I even know some of the stories that I want to tell in it. But I’m going to take a little bit of a break, thanks to the coronavirus, so is everyone else for a little while. But I do intend to do a fourth season."

References

External links
Cosmos: Possible Worlds at National Geographic
Cosmos: Possible Worlds at Fox

 – Trailer (2:03)

2020 American television series debuts
2020 American television series endings
2020s American documentary television series
American sequel television series
American television series with live action and animation
Astronomy education television series
Television shows scored by Alan Silvestri
Fox Broadcasting Company original programming
National Geographic (American TV channel) original programming
Neil deGrasse Tyson
Television series by Fuzzy Door Productions